The Art Institute of Chicago in Chicago's Grant Park, founded in 1879, is one of the oldest and largest art museums in the world. Recognized for its curatorial efforts and popularity among visitors, the museum hosts approximately 1.5 million people annually. Its collection, stewarded by 11 curatorial departments, is encyclopedic, and includes iconic works such as Georges Seurat's A Sunday on La Grande Jatte, Pablo Picasso's The Old Guitarist, Edward Hopper's Nighthawks, and Grant Wood's American Gothic. Its permanent collection of nearly 300,000 works of art is augmented by more than 30 special exhibitions mounted yearly that illuminate aspects of the collection and present cutting-edge curatorial and scientific research.

As a research institution, the Art Institute also has a conservation and conservation science department, five conservation laboratories, and one of the largest art history and architecture libraries in the country—the Ryerson and Burnham Libraries.

The growth of the collection has warranted several additions to the museum's 1893 building, which was constructed for the World's Columbian Exposition. The most recent expansion, the Modern Wing designed by Renzo Piano, opened in 2009 and increased the museum's footprint to nearly one million square feet, making it the second-largest art museum in the United States, after the Metropolitan Museum of Art. The Art Institute is associated with the School of the Art Institute of Chicago, a leading art school, making it one of the few remaining unified arts institutions in the United States.

In 2017, the Art Institute received 1,619,316 visitors, and was the 35th most-visited art museum in the world. However, in 2020, due to the COVID-19 pandemic, the museum was closed for 169 days, and attendance plunged by 78 percent from 2019, to 365,660.

History
In 1866, a group of 35 artists founded the Chicago Academy of Design in a studio on Dearborn Street, with the intent to run a free school with its own art gallery. The organization was modeled after European art academies, such as the Royal Academy, with Academicians and Associate Academicians. The academy's charter was granted in March 1867.

Classes started in 1868, meeting every day at a cost of $10 per month. The academy's success enabled it to build a new home for the school, a five-story stone building on 66 West Adams Street, which opened on November 22, 1870.

When the Great Chicago Fire destroyed the building in 1871 the academy was thrown into debt. Attempts to continue despite the loss by using rented facilities failed. By 1878, the academy was $10,000 in debt. Members tried to rescue the ailing institution by making deals with local businessmen, before some finally abandoned it in 1879 to found a new organization, named the Chicago Academy of Fine Arts. When the Chicago Academy of Design went bankrupt the same year, the new Chicago Academy of Fine Arts bought its assets at auction.

In 1882, the Chicago Academy of Fine Arts changed its name to the current Art Institute of Chicago and elected as its first president the banker and philanthropist Charles L. Hutchinson, who "is arguably the single most important individual to have shaped the direction and fortunes of the Art Institute of Chicago". Hutchinson was a director of many prominent Chicago organizations, including the University of Chicago, and would transform the Art Institute into a world-class museum during his presidency, which he held until his death in 1924. Also in 1882, the organization purchased a lot on the southwest corner of Michigan Avenue and Van Buren Street for $45,000. The existing commercial building on that property was used for the organization's headquarters, and a new addition was constructed behind it to provide gallery space and to house the school's facilities. By January 1885 the trustees recognized the need to provide additional space for the organization's growing collection, and to this end purchased the vacant lot directly south on Michigan Avenue. The commercial building was demolished, and the noted architect John Wellborn Root was hired by Hutchinson to design a building that would create an "impressive presence" on Michigan Avenue, and these facilities opened to great fanfare in 1887.

With the announcement of the World's Columbian Exposition to be held in 1892–93, the Art Institute pressed for a building on the lakefront to be constructed for the fair, but to be used by the institute afterwards. The city agreed, and the building was completed in time for the second year of the fair. Construction costs were met by selling the Michigan/Van Buren property. On October 31, 1893, the institute moved into the new building. For the opening reception on December 8, 1893, Theodore Thomas and the Chicago Symphony Orchestra performed.

From the early 1900s to the 1960s the school offered with the Logan Family (members of the board) the Logan Medal of the Arts, an award which became one of the most distinguished awards presented to artists in the US. Between 1959 and 1970, the institute was a key site in the battle to gain art and documentary photography a place in galleries, under curator Hugh Edwards and his assistants.

As director of the museum starting in the early 1980s, James N. Wood conducted a major expansion of its collection and oversaw a major renovation and expansion project for its facilities. As "one of the most respected museum leaders in the country", as described by The New York Times, Wood created major exhibitions of works by Paul Gauguin, Claude Monet and Vincent van Gogh that set records for attendance at the museum. He retired from the museum in 2004.
 
The institute began construction of "The Modern Wing", an addition situated on the southwest corner of Columbus and Monroe in the early 21st century. The project, designed by Pritzker Prize–winning architect Renzo Piano, was completed and officially opened to the public on May 16, 2009. The  building addition made the Art Institute the second-largest art museum in the United States. The building houses the museum's world-renowned collections of 20th and 21st century art, specifically modern European painting and sculpture, contemporary art, architecture and design, and photography. In its inaugural survey in 2014, travel review website and forum, Tripadvisor, reviewed millions of travelers' surveys and named the Art Institute the world's best museum.

The museum received perhaps the largest gift of art in its history in 2015. Collectors Stefan Edlis and Gael Neeson donated a "collection [that] is among the world's greatest groups of postwar Pop art ever assembled". The donation includes works by Andy Warhol, Jasper Johns, Cy Twombly, Jeff Koons, Charles Ray, Richard Prince, Cindy Sherman, Roy Lichtenstein and Gerhard Richter. The museum agreed to keep the donated work on display for at least 50 years. In June 2018, the museum received a $50 million donation, the largest single announced monetary donation in its history.

Collection

The collection of the Art Institute of Chicago encompasses more than 5,000 years of human expression from cultures around the world and contains more than 300,000 works of art in 11 curatorial departments, ranging from early Japanese prints to the art of the Byzantine Empire to contemporary American art. It is principally known for one of the United States' finest collection of paintings produced in Western culture.

African Art and Indian Art of the Americas 
The Art Institute's African Art and Indian Art of the Americas collections are on display across two galleries in the south end of the Michigan Avenue building. The African collection includes more than 400 works that span the continent, highlighting ceramics, garments, masks, and jewelry.

The Amerindian collection includes Native North American art and Mesoamerican and Andean works. From pottery to textiles, the collection brings together a wide array of objects that seek to illustrate the thematic and aesthetic focuses of art spanning the Americas.

American Art 

The Art Institute's American Art collection contains some of the best-known works in the American canon, including Edward Hopper's Nighthawks, Grant Wood's American Gothic, and Mary Cassatt's The Child's Bath. The collection ranges from colonial silver to modern and contemporary paintings.

The museum purchased Nighthawks in 1942 for $3,000; its acquisition "launched" the painting into "immense popular recognition". Considered an "icon of American culture", Nighthawks is perhaps Hopper's most famous painting, as well as one of the most recognizable images in American art. Also well known, American Gothic has been in the museum's collection since 1930 and was only loaned outside of North America for the first time in 2016. Wood's painting depicts what has been called "the most famous couple in the world", a dour, rural-American, father and daughter. It was entered into a contest at the Art Institute in 1930, and although not a favorite of some, it won a medal and was acquired by the museum.

Ancient and Byzantine 
The Art Institute's ancient collection spans nearly 4,000 years of art and history, showcasing Greek, Etruscan, Roman, and Egyptian sculpture, mosaics, pottery, jewelry, glass, and bronze as well as a robust and well-maintained collection of ancient coins. There are around 5,000 works in the collection, offering a comprehensive survey of the ancient and medieval Mediterranean world, beginning with the third millennium B.C. and extending to the Byzantine Empire. The collection also holds the mummy and mummy case of Paankhenamun.

Architecture and Design 
The Department of Architecture and Design holds more than 140,000 works, from models to drawings from the 1870s to the present day. The collection covers landscape architecture, structural engineering, and industrial design, including the works of Frank Lloyd Wright, Ludwig Mies van der Rohe, and Le Corbusier.

Asian Art 
The Art Institute's Asian collection spans nearly 5,000 years, including significant works and objects from China, Korea, Japan, India, Southeast Asia, and the Near and Middle East. There are 35,000 objects in the collection, showcasing bronzes, ceramics, and jades as well as textiles, screens, woodcuts, and sculptures. One gallery in particular attempts to mimic the quiet and meditative way in which Japanese screens are traditionally viewed.

European Decorative Arts 

The Art Institute's collection of European decorative arts includes some 25,000 objects of furniture, ceramics, metalwork, glass, enamel, and ivory from 1100 A.D. to the present day. The department contains the 1,544 objects in the Arthur Rubloff Paperweight Collection and the 68 Thorne Miniature Rooms–a collection of miniaturized interiors of a 1:12 scale showcasing American, European, and Asian architectural and furniture styles from the Middle Ages to the 1930s (when the rooms were constructed). Both the paperweights and the Thorne Rooms are located on the ground floor of the museum.

European Painting and Sculpture 

The museum is most famous for its collections of Impressionist and Post-Impressionist paintings, widely regarded as one of the finest collections outside of France. Highlights include more than 30 paintings by Claude Monet, including six of his Haystacks and a number of Water Lilies. Also in the collection are important works by Pierre-Auguste Renoir such as Two Sisters (On the Terrace), and Gustave Caillebotte's Paris Street; Rainy Day. Post-Impressionist works include Paul Cézanne's The Basket of Apples, and Madame Cézanne in a Yellow Chair. At the Moulin Rouge by Henri de Toulouse-Lautrec is another highlight. The pointillist masterpiece, which also inspired a musical and was famously featured in Ferris Bueller's Day Off, Georges Seurat's Sunday Afternoon on La Grande Jatte—1884, is prominently displayed. Additionally, Henri Matisse's Bathers by a River, is an important example of his work. Highlights of non-French paintings of the Impressionist and Post-Impressionist collection include Vincent van Gogh's Bedroom in Arles and Self-portrait, 1887.

In the mid-1930s, the Art Institute received a gift of over one hundred works of art from Annie Swan Coburn ("Mr. and Mrs. Lewis Larned Coburn Memorial Collection"). The "Coburn Renoirs" became the core of the Art Institute's Impressionist painting collection.

The collection also includes the Medieval and Renaissance Art, Arms, and Armor holdings, including the George F. Harding Collection of arms and armor, and three centuries of Old Masters works.

Modern and Contemporary Art 

The museum's collection of modern and contemporary art was significantly augmented when collectors Stefan Edlis and Gael Neeson gifted 40 plus master works to the department in 2015. Pablo Picasso's Old Guitarist, Henri Matisse's Bathers by a River, Constantin Brâncuși's Golden Bird, and René Magritte's Time Transfixed are highlights of the modern galleries, located on the third floor of the Modern Wing. The contemporary installation, located on the second floor, contains works by Andy Warhol, Cindy Sherman, Cy Twombly, Jackson Pollock, Jasper Johns, and other significant modern and contemporary artists.

Photography 
The Art Institute didn't officially establish a photography collection until 1949, when Georgia O'Keeffe donated a significant portion of the Alfred Stieglitz collection to the museum. Since then, the museum's collection has grown to approximately 20,000 works spanning the history of the artform from its inception in 1839 to the present.

Prints and Drawings 
The print and drawings collection began with a donation by Elizabeth S. Stickney of 460 works in 1887, and was organized into its own department of the museum in 1911. Their holdings have subsequently grown to 11,500 drawings and 60,000 prints, ranging from 15th-century works to contemporary. The collection contains a strong group of the works of Albrecht Dürer, Rembrandt van Rijn, Francisco Goya, and James McNeill Whistler. Because works on paper are sensitive to light and degrade quickly, the works are on display infrequently in order to keep them in good condition for as long as possible.

Textiles 
The Department of Textiles has more than 13,000 textiles and 66,000 sample swatches in total, covering an array of cultures from 300 B.C. to the present. From English needlework to Japanese garments to American quilts, the collection presents a diverse group of objects, including contemporary works and fiber art.

Architecture

 
The current building at 111 South Michigan Avenue is the third address for the Art Institute. It was designed in the Beaux-Arts style by Shepley, Rutan and Coolidge of Boston for the 1893 World's Columbian Exposition as the World's Congress Auxiliary Building with the intent that the Art Institute occupy the space after the fair closed.

The Art Institute's famous western entrance on Michigan Avenue is guarded by two bronze lion statues created by Edward Kemeys. The lions were unveiled on May 10, 1894, each weighing more than two tons. The sculptor gave them unofficial names: the south lion is "stands in an attitude of defiance", and the north lion is "on the prowl". When a Chicago sports team plays in the championships of their respective league (i.e. the Super Bowl or Stanley Cup Finals, not the entire playoffs), the lions are frequently dressed in that team's uniform. Evergreen wreaths are placed around their necks during the Christmas season.

The east entrance of the museum is marked by the stone arch entrance to the old Chicago Stock Exchange. Designed by Louis Sullivan in 1894, the Exchange was torn down in 1972, but salvaged portions of the original trading room were brought to the Art Institute and reconstructed.

The Art Institute building has the unusual property of straddling open-air railroad tracks. Two stories of gallery space connect the east and west buildings while the Metra Electric and South Shore lines operate below. The lower level of gallery space was formerly the windowless Gunsaulus hall, but is now home to the Alsdorf Galleries showcasing Indian, Southeast Asian and Himalayan Art. During renovation, windows facing north toward Millennium Park were added. The gallery space was designed by Renzo Piano in conjunction with his design of the Modern Wing and features the same window screening used there to protect the art from direct sunlight. The upper level formerly held the modern European galleries, but was renovated in 2008 and now features the Impressionist and Post-Impressionist galleries.

Libraries
Located on the ground floor of the museum is the Ryerson & Burnham Libraries. The Libraries' collections cover all periods of art, but is most known for its extensive collection of 18th to 20th century architecture. It serves the museum staff, college and university students, and is also open to the general public. The Friends of the Libraries, a support group for the Libraries, offers events and special tours for its members.

Modern Wing

On May 16, 2009, the Art Institute opened the Modern Wing, the largest expansion in the museum's history. The  addition, designed by Renzo Piano, makes the Art Institute the second-largest museum in the US. The architect of record in the City of Chicago for this building was Interactive Design. The Modern Wing is home to the museum's collection of early 20th-century European art, including Pablo Picasso's The Old Guitarist, Henri Matisse's Bathers by a River, and René Magritte's Time Transfixed. The Lindy and Edwin Bergman Collection of Surrealist art includes the largest public display of Joseph Cornell's works (37 boxes and collages). The Wing also houses contemporary art from after 1960; new photography, video media, architecture and design galleries including original renderings by Frank Lloyd Wright, Ludwig Mies van der Rohe and Bruce Goff; temporary exhibition space; shops and classrooms; a cafe and a restaurant, Terzo Piano, that overlooks Millennium Park from its terrace. In addition, the Nichols Bridgeway connects a sculpture garden on the roof of the new wing with the adjacent Millennium Park to the north and a courtyard designed by Gustafson Guthrie Nichol.
In 2009, the Modern Wing won at the Chicago Innovation Awards.

Selections from the permanent collection
Note that other notable works are in the collection but the following examples are ones in the public domain and for which pictures are available. In 2018, as it redesigned its website, the Art Institute released 52,438 of its public domain works, under the Creative Commons Zero (CC0) licence.

Paintings

Sculptures

More highlights from the collection

Governance

Attendance 
During 2009, attendance was around 2 million—up 33 percent from 2008—in addition to a total of approximately 100,000 museum memberships. Despite a 25 percent boost in museum admission fees, the Modern Wing was a major catalyst for a rise in visitor traffic.

Finances 

As of 2011, the Art Institute continues to rebuild its $783 million endowment since the recession. In June 2008, its endowment was $827 million. As of 2012, the museum is rated A1 by Moody's, its fifth-highest grade, in part reflecting the museum's pension and retirement liabilities; Standard & Poor's rates the museum A+, fifth-best. In October 2012, the Art Institute sold about $100 million of taxable and tax-exempt bonds partly to shore up unfunded pension obligations.

The $294 million extension in 2009 was the culmination of a $385 million fundraising campaign—roughly $300 million for design and construction and $85 million for the endowment. Around $370 million were raised primarily from private patrons in Chicago. In 2011, the Art Institute received a $10 million gift from the Jaharis Family Foundation to renovate and expand galleries devoted to Greek, Roman and Byzantine art, as well as to support acquisitions and special exhibitions of that art.

Acquisitions and deaccessioning 
In 1990, the Art Institute of Chicago sold 11 works at auction, including paintings by Claude Monet, Pablo Picasso, Amedeo Modigliani, Maurice Utrillo and Edgar Degas, to raise the $12 million purchase price of a bronze sculpture, Golden Bird, by Constantin Brâncuși. At the time, the sculpture was owned by the Arts Club of Chicago, which was selling it to buy a new gallery for its other works. In 2005, the museum sold two paintings by Marc Chagall and Auguste Renoir at Sotheby's. In 2011, it auctioned two Picassos (Sur l'impériale traversant la Seine (1901) and Verre et pipe (1919)), Henri Matisse's Femme au fauteuil (1919), and Georges Braque's Nature morte à la guitare (rideaux rouge) (1938) at Christie's in London.

Directors 
 William M.R. French (1885–1914)
 Newton Carpenter (1914–1916)
 George Eggers (1918–1921)
 Robert Harshe (1921–1938)
 Daniel Catton Rich (1938–1958)
 Allen McNab (1956–1965)
 Charles Cunningham (1965–1972)
 E. Laurence Chalmers (1972–1986)
 James N. Wood (1980–2004)
 James Cuno (2004–2011)
 Douglas Druick (2011–2016)
 James Rondeau (2016–present)

Controversy

Management of investments dispute
In 2002, the Art Institute of Chicago filed suit alleging fraud by a small Dallas firm called Integral Investment Management, along with related parties. The museum, which put $43 million of its endowment into funds run by the defendants, claimed that it faced losses of up to 90% on the investments after they soured.

Construction disputes
In 2010, the year after the opening of its massive Modern Wing, the Art Institute of Chicago sued the engineering firm Ove Arup for $10 million over what it said were flaws in the concrete floors and air-circulation systems. The suit was settled out of court.

Docent program diversity dispute
In 2021, the Art Institute ended its unpaid volunteer docents program to move to a paid model. The Chicago Tribune editorial page criticized the Institute's letter announcing the change and the move to a new model, arguing that "[o]nce you cut through the blather, the letter basically said the museum had looked critically at its corps of docents, a group dominated by mostly (but not entirely) white, retired women with some time to spare, and found them wanting as a demographic." The institute's director, Robert M. Levy, responded in a Tribune op-ed supporting the change, and described the Tribune's editorial as having "numerous inaccuracies and mischaracterizations", noted that the docent program had already been largely on pause for the past 15 months due to the COVID pandemic, and argued that the decision was not about anyone's identity, it was in keeping with changing modern museum practices around the world.

Following a volunteerism surge in the late 1940s, the program had been created in 1961 to revitalize and expand "programming for children." Among other matters, since 2014 the program had been trying to attract a more diverse socioeconomic perspective set of art-tour guides, given the unpaid time commitment needed.

In popular culture
Director John Hughes included a sequence in the Art Institute in his 1986 film Ferris Bueller's Day Off, which is set in Chicago. During it the characters are shown viewing A Sunday Afternoon on the Island of La Grande Jatte. Hughes had first visited the institute as a "refuge" while in high school. Hughes' commentary on the sequence was used as a reference point by journalist Hadley Freeman in a discussion of the Republican presidential primary candidates in 2011.

The paintings used in the 1970 Parker Brothers board game Masterpiece are works held in the Art Institute's collection.

See also

 American Academy of Art
 Bessie Bennett, early 20th century Curator of Decorative Art
 Forest Idyll
 List of most-visited museums in the United States
 List of museums and cultural institutions in Chicago
 Alme Meyvis
 Visual arts of Chicago
 Lions (Kemeys)

References

External links
 
 Art Institute's Impressionistic collection, YouTube
Virtual tour of the Art Institute of Chicago provided by Google Arts & Culture

 
Art museums and galleries in Chicago
Art museums and galleries in Illinois
Central Chicago
Museums of American art
Asian art museums in the United States
Institutions accredited by the American Alliance of Museums
1879 establishments in Illinois
Art museums established in 1879
Tourist attractions along U.S. Route 66
Tourist attractions in Chicago
African art museums in the United States